Michael Grattan O'Leary  (February 19, 1888–April 7, 1976) was a Canadian journalist, publisher and a member of the Senate of Canada.

He was born in Percé, in the Gaspé, Quebec on February 19, 1888. He spent two years at sea before entering journalism with the St. John Standard. He began work at the Ottawa Journal in 1911. He later became editor of the paper. He was a member of the Parliamentary Press Gallery for more than 20 years.

At various times, he was the Ottawa correspondent of The Times, a contributor to British, United States and Canadian magazines, and was Canadian Editor of Collier's.

He has attended imperial and international conferences in London, Washington, and Canberra, and was at the Potsdam Conference in 1945.

He took a very an active interest in public affairs. He ran as a Conservative Party candidate in the federal riding of Gaspé in the general election of 1925 but was defeated. He was a confidant of a number of Prime Ministers, including Arthur Meighen and John Diefenbaker. He chaired the Royal Commission on Publications. O'Leary was appointed by Diefenbaker to the Senate in 1962.

He also served as the Rector of Queen's University in Kingston, Ontario in 1968 but was forced to resign under student pressure.

He died in Ottawa on April 7, 1976.

Archives 
There is a Grattan O'Leary fonds at Library and Archives Canada.

References

External links
 
 
 
 

1888 births
1976 deaths
Canadian senators from Ontario
Conservative Party of Canada (1867–1942) candidates for the Canadian House of Commons
Journalists from Ontario
Journalists from Quebec
Progressive Conservative Party of Canada senators
Quebec people of Irish descent